Roger Anthony Smith (born 3 November 1944) is an English former professional footballer who played as a winger in the English Football League for Exeter City in the 1960s.

Statistics
Source:

References

1944 births
Living people
Sportspeople from Welwyn Garden City
English footballers
Association football wingers
Tottenham Hotspur F.C. players
Exeter City F.C. players
Ashford United F.C. players
English Football League players
Southern Football League players